Coming of Age is a British sitcom, written by Tim Dawson, produced in house by BBC Productions, and broadcast on the former channel BBC Three. The show takes a direct look at five sixth form students, Jas, Ollie, Matt, Chloe and DK, as well as, from series three, new character Robyn Crisp, who are living in Abingdon. Their lives rotate around the fictional Wooton College, their bedrooms, and Ollie's garden shed. A pilot originally aired in 2007, followed by the first series in 2008, a second series in 2010, and a third beginning in January 2011. In 2011, the show was cancelled along with other long running BBC Three programmes including Ideal, Two Pints of Lager and a Packet of Crisps, Hotter Than My Daughter, and Doctor Who Confidential. The first series was released on DVD on 26 October 2009, however, no further series have been released on DVD.

Recording

Coming of Age is set in Abingdon, Oxfordshire. Although the show consists of scenes recorded on location and pre-recorded studio scenes, most of the show is recorded in front of a live studio audience at BBC Television Centre, White City, London. Wooton College external shots were filmed at Abingdon and Witney College, Abingdon Campus.

Theme
The Coming of Age production team joined forces with BBC Introducing, a BBC-wide project that supports unsigned, undiscovered and under-the-radar artists and DJs, to find the original theme tune and sound for the show. They held a competition for six up-and-coming artists including KateGoes, to write a theme tune for the show from a written specification. KateGoes won and the theme was recorded in the studio of Richie Webb whose credits include That Mitchell and Webb Look and Comedy Shuffle, to create the final theme tune for the show.

Cast

Episodes
Twenty-three episodes of Coming of Age were broadcast over the course of three series. There are number of differences between the pilot and the subsequent series. Most notably, Alex Kew and Amy Yamazaki, who played Ollie and Jas in the pilot, have been replaced by Ceri Phillips and Hannah Job. Also, Dani Harmer originally played Chloe, but was replaced by Anabel Barnston. As well as new sets, the theme tune also changed, from "Steady, As She Goes" by The Raconteurs to a specially written piece by Birmingham band KateGoes and Richie Webb.

Pilot (2007)

Series 1 (2008)

Comic Relief Special (2009)

Series 2 (2010)

Series 3 (2011)

Reception
The show proved enormously popular with its target audience from the beginning, with Series 1 enjoying an average weekly reach of 1.2 million, and each episode appearing in the top 10 requested programmes on BBC iPlayer the day following transmission. Series 2 built on this success, with the first episode premiering to 719,000 viewers. BBC Three controller Danny Cohen (who commissioned the show) noted: "I'm delighted that Coming Of Age has been such a hit with young viewers. The writer Tim Dawson and the young cast are bright emerging stars for the BBC." Despite this, the show often receives a poor reaction from television critics. Writing about the first episode, The Daily Telegraph'''s Culture magazine was negative: "Crudeness abounds... but neither wit nor charm has tagged along for the ride." Harry Venning in The Stagestated that most of the show's humour "was unremittingly dire" and stated " I sat through Coming Of Age with the will to live seeping from my every pore, leaving me drenched in a puddle of despair. Apparently writer Tim Dawson was 19 when he wrote it, which is about six years older than I would have guessed."

Meanwhile, The Scotsman said simply: "Coming of Age'' may be the worst BBC sitcom yet. It is supposedly aimed at teenagers, but I refuse to believe that even the easiest-to-please teenager is happy to accept something so horribly written, horribly acted and horribly vulgar in lieu of actual humour." However, some have been more willing to acknowledge the sitcom's appeal, with the British Comedy Guide conceding, "For its fans, it's a heightened reflection of their own experience of teenage years, with brilliantly absurd exchanges and sublime vulgarity to match."

Home releases

See also
 List of sitcoms known for negative reception

References

External links

2007 British television series debuts
2011 British television series endings
2000s British sex comedy television series
2000s British teen sitcoms
2000s college television series
2010s British sex comedy television series
2010s British teen sitcoms
2010s college television series
BBC television sitcoms
English-language television shows
Television series about couples
Television shows set in Oxfordshire
Virginity in television